Helicoverpa prepodes is a species of moth of the family Noctuidae that is endemic to New South Wales and Queensland.

External links
Australian Faunal Directory

prepodes
Moths described in 1985